The New Orleans Women's Open was a golf tournament on the LPGA Tour from 1952 to 1954. It was played in New Orleans, Louisiana at City Park Golf Course in 1952 and 1953 and at the Colonial Golf and Country Club in 1954.

Winners
1954 Marlene Bauer
1953 Patty Berg
1952 Patty Berg

References

Former LPGA Tour events
Golf in New Orleans
Golf
Women's sports in Louisiana